Lori Den Hartog is an American politician serving as a member of the Idaho Senate from the 22nd district. She assumed office on December 1, 2014.

Early life and education 
Den Hartog was born in Escondido, California and graduated from Nampa Christian High School. She earned a Bachelor of Arts degree in business administration and public administration from Dordt College.

Career 
Outside of politics, Den Hartog has worked in land use, transportation planning, and grant administration. She was elected to the Idaho Senate in November 2014 and assumed office on December 1, 2014. From 2017 to 2020, Den Hartog served as vice chair of the Senate Agricultural Affairs Committee. In the 2021–2022 legislative session, she is chair of the Senate Transportation Committee.

Personal life
Den Hartog and her husband, Scott, were married in 2002. They have three children.

Den Hartog's father, John Vander Woude, also a Republican, is a member of the Idaho House of Representatives. This marked the first time a father and daughter have served together in the Idaho legislature.

References

External links
 
 Campaign website

People from Escondido, California
Living people
Dordt University alumni
Republican Party Idaho state senators
People from Nampa, Idaho
Women state legislators in Idaho
21st-century American politicians
21st-century American women politicians
Year of birth missing (living people)